Vernon Alley (May 26, 1915 – October 3, 2004) was an American jazz bassist.

Early life 
Alley was born in Winnemucca, Nevada, and played football in high school and college. His brother, Eddie Alley, was a drummer; they played together often.

Career 
Vernon played with Wes People in 1937 and with Saunders King until the end of the decade. He briefly led his own band in 1940.

Around 1940, while in Lionel Hampton's band, Alley switched from double bass to electric upright bass, one of the first musicians to do so. In 1942, he joined Count Basie's ensemble, where he played only for a few months and appeared in the film Reveille with Beverly.

Alley enlisted in the United States Navy as a musician in 1942 and after training at Camp Robert Smalls, he was assigned as part of a 45-piece regimental band to the Navy's PreFlight School located at Saint Mary's College of California. Others who served in this band included Ernie and Marshal Royal, Jackie Kelso, Wilbert Baranco, Earl Watkins, and Buddy Collette.

After returning to civilian life, Alley put together an ensemble in San Francisco. He continued to play there and was an active member on local radio and in civic arts into the 1990s.

Death 
Alley died in San Francisco 2004. In his obituary, Peter Fimrite of the San Francisco Chronicle described Alley as "the most distinguished jazz musician in San Francisco history."

References

External links
[ Vernon Alley] at Allmusic

1915 births
2004 deaths
American jazz double-bassists
Male double-bassists
American jazz bass guitarists
American male bass guitarists
Guitarists from Nevada
20th-century American bass guitarists
People from Winnemucca, Nevada
San Francisco State University alumni
20th-century double-bassists
20th-century American male musicians
American male jazz musicians